HMS Albacore was a "thirty-knotter" destroyer of the British Royal Navy, which was later classified as part of the B class. She was built by Palmer's of Yarrow as a private venture, launching in 1906, and being purchased in 1909. She served through the First World War before being sold for scrap in 1919.

Construction and design
The shipbuilder Palmers Shipbuilding and Iron Company laid down two destroyers on speculation (i.e. without a specific order) on 1 September 1905, as Yard Numbers 786 and 787. The two destroyers were of generally similar size and design to the Royal Navy's earlier  "thirty knotter" destroyers (later redesignated as the B, C or D class depending on the number of funnels), with a turtleback forecastle, with the Royal Navy having abandoned the "thirty-knotter" type for the River-class destroyers, with a higher raised forecastle instead of a turtleback, and sacrificing high speed in sea trials in favour of greater seaworthiness. The first of the two ships, which would later become HMS Albacore, was launched on 9 October 1906. Palmer's was unable to find a customer for these ships, however, and offered to sell them to the Royal Navy on 5 December 1907 for £70,000–80,000 each. A provisional order for the two ships was placed on 8 May 1908, at a price of £60,000 each, depending on successful trials, with a speed of  being required.

The ships had four funnels, with the middle two funnels closely spaced.

The ship's stem was higher than earlier turtleback destroyers, while rather than the narrow conning tower of the earlier destroyers, Albacore had a full width bridge situated further aft, which was claimed by Palmer's to make the ship much dryer in heavy seas. Gun armament consisted of three QF 12 pounder 12 cwt naval guns, with two situated side by side on top of the bridge and one aft. Two 18 inch (450 mm) torpedo tubes were carried, while the ship had a complement of 56 officers and men.

Service
Although it was hoped that the ship could be accepted quickly, with delivery expected within two to three months of the order being placed, official sea trials proved problematical. Albacore only reached a maximum of  instead of the required 31 knots, which may have been due to more realistic trial conditions. The Admiralty finally agreed to accept Albacore and her sister ship Bonetta on 3 March 1909, paying £45,000 for each. HMS Albacore was commissioned on 27 March that year.

Albacore was part of the Fourth Destroyer Flotilla in 1910, and of the Sixth Flotilla in 1913. On 30 August 1912 the Admiralty directed all destroyers were to be grouped into classes designated by letters based on appearance. As a four-funneled ship, Albacore was listed as a B-class destroyer on 1 October 1913. On 6 April 1914 a boiler tube burst in Chatham harbour, killing three men.

On the outbreak of the First World War in August 1914, Albacore was sent to Scapa Flow to join the local patrol flotilla protecting the anchorage of the Grand Fleet. Albacore was sold for scrap on 1 August 1919.

Pennant numbers

Notes

Citations

Bibliography
 
 
 
 
 
 
 
 

 

Ships built on the River Tyne
B-class destroyers (1913)
World War I destroyers of the United Kingdom